The 1992–93 Montreal Canadiens season was the team's 76th season in the National Hockey League (NHL) and their 84th overall. Coming off of a disappointing second round playoff exit against the Boston Bruins during the 1991–92 season, the third-straight season Boston had defeated Montreal in the playoffs, the Canadiens were champions for the 1992–93 season.

The 1992–93 Canadiens remain the last Canadian-based team to win the Stanley Cup, having won the 1993 Stanley Cup Finals.

Off-season
In the off-season, the Canadiens would replace head coach Pat Burns and hire former Quebec Nordiques, St. Louis Blues and Detroit Red Wings head coach Jacques Demers to take his spot. The team also made some trades during the summer, acquiring Vincent Damphousse from the Edmonton Oilers, and Brian Bellows from the Minnesota North Stars.

Denis Savard is named an alternate captain, following Mike McPhee's trade to the North Stars.

Regular season
The Canadiens would get off to a quick start, sitting on top of the Adams Division with a 16–5–3 record in their opening 24 games. The team would slump to an 8–9–2 record in their next 19 games, and fall behind their provincial rivals, the Quebec Nordiques, in the standings. Montreal would get hot, going 17–4–1, to take a commanding lead in the division, but a late-season slump, as Montreal would have a record of 7–11–0 in their final 18 games, falling behind the Boston Bruins and Nordiques to finish third in the division with 102 points and a 48–30–6 record.

On January 25, 1993, rookie Ed Ronan scored just 14 seconds into the overtime period to give the Canadiens a 3-2 home win over the Boston Bruins. It would prove to be the fastest overtime goal scored during the 1992-93 NHL regular season.

Four Canadiens (Brian Bellows, Vincent Damphousse, Stephan Lebeau and Kirk Muller) reached the 30-goal plateau. In his first season with the team, Vincent Damphousse led the club offensively, scoring 39 goals and earning a team-high 97 points. Brian Bellows, also in his first season in Montreal, had a team-high 40 goals and finished with 88 points. Kirk Muller scored 37 goals and had 94 points, while Stephan Lebeau had a breakout season, scoring 80 points. Eric Desjardins led the blueline with 13 goals and 45 points, while Mathieu Schneider also recorded 13 goals from the blueline and finished with 44 points.

In goal, Patrick Roy played the majority of the games, leading the club with 31 wins and a 3.20 goals against average (GAA) in 62 games, as well as two shutouts. Andre Racicot backed-up Roy, winning 17 of 26 games played while posting a 3.39 GAA and a shutout.

At the beginning of the 1992–93 season, Upper Deck made Patrick Roy a spokesperson. Roy was an ideal choice as he was a hockey card collector, and his collection amounted to over 150,000 cards. An ad campaign was launched and it had an adverse effect on Roy's season. Upper Deck had a slogan called "Trade Roy", and it was posted on billboards throughout the city of Montreal. A Journal de Montreal poll, published on January 13, 1993, indicated that 57% of fans favoured Patrick Roy. Before the trading deadline, Canadiens General Manager Serge Savard insisted that he would consider a trade for Roy. The Canadiens would end the season by winning only 8 of their last 19 games.

All-Star Game
The 44th National Hockey League All-Star Game was played at the Montreal Forum, on February 6, 1993, where the Wales Conference beat the Campbell Conference, 16–6.
Patrick Roy and Kirk Muller participated in the all-star game as members of the Wales Conference All-Stars.

Final standings

Schedule and results

Playoffs

In the playoffs, the Canadiens opened up against their Battle of Quebec rivals, the Quebec Nordiques. Quebec finished in second place in the division, two points ahead of Montreal. Quebec opened the series with two wins on home ice, sending the series back to Montreal. The Canadiens responded in the third game with a 2–1 overtime win, to cut the Nordiques series lead to 2–1. Montreal followed that up with a solid 3–2 win in game four to even the series as it shifted back to Quebec City. Game five was not settled in regulation time, as the Canadiens and Nordiques were tied 4–4, and Montreal stunned the Nordiques home crowd with an overtime goal to win the game 5–4, and they take control of the series with a 3–2 lead, heading back to the Forum for the sixth game. Montreal then closed out the series at home, defeating the Nordiques 6–2 and advance to the second round of the playoffs for the tenth straight season.

Up next was the Buffalo Sabres, who had upset the division-winning Boston Bruins in the opening round. Montreal finished 16 points ahead of the Sabres during the regular season. The Canadiens, who ended their series with the Nordiques with four straight wins, continued their hot streak, defeating the Sabres by identical 4–3 scores in the opening two games, winning the second game in overtime. The series then moved to Buffalo, but Montreal recorded another 4–3 overtime victory, to take a commanding 3–0 series lead. The Habs swept Buffalo, with yet another 4–3 overtime win in game four, moving to the Conference final for the first time since 1989.

The Canadiens next opponent would be the surprising New York Islanders, who had just defeated the heavily-favoured Pittsburgh Penguins to earn a spot in the Conference finals. The Islanders had 87 points in the regular season, 15 less than Montreal. The Canadiens stayed red hot, with a 4–1 victory in the first game, before winning 4–3 in double overtime to take a 2–0 series lead, and extend their winning streak to 10 games. Game three on Long Island again headed into overtime, with Montreal winning again, by a score of 2–1, to win their eleventh straight playoff game, tying the NHL record which was set by the Pittsburgh Penguins and Chicago Blackhawks in the 1992 playoffs. The Islanders held off the Canadiens in the fourth game to avoid the sweep and end the Canadiens' winning streak; however, Montreal closed out the series in the fifth game, and move to the Stanley Cup Final for the first time in four years.

Montreal's final opponent of the playoffs was the Los Angeles Kings. The Kings, led by Wayne Gretzky, had defeated the Calgary Flames, Vancouver Canucks, and Toronto Maple Leafs to earn their first ever trip to the Stanley Cup Finals. Los Angeles finished the season with 88 points, 14 less than Montreal.

The first game, held at the Forum, belonged to the Kings, as they stunned the Montreal crowd with a 4–1 victory. Montreal rebounded in game two, as a late penalty call on Marty McSorley for using an illegal stick gave the Canadiens a late powerplay, on which they scored to tie the game up at 2–2. The game headed into overtime, and Montreal again prevailed, winning the game 3–2 to tie up the series. The series moved to Los Angeles for the third game, and Montreal continued their overtime magic, with a 4–3 OT victory to take a 2–1 series lead. The fourth game again headed into overtime, and again, the Canadiens won, their NHL record tenth consecutive overtime victory, to take a 3–1 series lead with the series headed back to Montreal for the fifth game. The Canadiens had few problems with a tired Kings team in the fifth game, winning 4–1, and earning their 24th Stanley Cup in team history. Patrick Roy was named the winner of the Conn Smythe Trophy. It remains the last time that Montreal won the Stanley Cup championship, as well as the last time a Canadian team won the Cup. Roy won two more Stanley Cups with the Colorado Avalanche in 1996 and 2001.

Montreal Canadiens 4, Quebec Nordiques 2

Montreal Canadiens 4, Buffalo Sabres 0

Montreal Canadiens 4, New York Islanders 1

Montreal Canadiens 4, Los Angeles Kings 1

Player statistics

Regular season
Scoring

Goaltending

Playoffs
Scoring

Goaltending

Awards and records
 Prince of Wales Trophy: Montreal Canadiens
 Conn Smythe Trophy: Patrick Roy
  Record: Ten consecutive playoff overtime wins
  Record: Eric Desjardins (game 2) – only NHL defenceman to score a hat-trick in a Cup Final game

Transactions

Draft picks
Montreal's draft picks at the 1992 NHL Entry Draft

Farm teams
 Fredericton Canadiens

See also
 1992–93 NHL season

References

 SHRP Sports
 The Internet Hockey Database
 National Hockey League Guide & Record Book 2007

Stanley Cup championship seasons
Montreal Canadiens seasons
Montreal Canadiens season, 1992-93
Montreal Canadiens season, 1992-93
Eastern Conference (NHL) championship seasons
National Hockey League All-Star Game hosts
Montreal